The Rapid Alert System for Food and Feed (RASFF) is a system for reporting food safety issues within the European Union established by Regulation (EC) 178/2002 of 28 January 2002, which entered into force on 21 February 2002. Its objective is to achieve "a high level of protection of human life and health", based on the principle that the free movement of food and feed within the European Community (now the European Union) can only be achieved if food and feed safety requirements do not differ significantly between Member States.

See also
 European Food Safety Authority
 Food and Agriculture Organization
 Food safety
 EUROPHYT
 TRACES

References

External links
 

Animal feed
European Union and agriculture
European Union food law
Food safety organizations
Regulation in the European Union